Stade de la Cavée Verte is a football stadium in Le Havre, France.

References

Cavee Verte
Sports venues in Seine-Maritime
Multi-purpose stadiums in France
Buildings and structures in Le Havre
Sports venues completed in 1918